Limnaecia callicosma is a moth in the family Cosmopterigidae. It is found in Sri Lanka.

References

Natural History Museum Lepidoptera generic names catalog

Limnaecia
Moths described in 1915
Moths of Sri Lanka
Taxa named by Edward Meyrick